Norma Holloway Johnson (July 28, 1932 – September 18, 2011), born Normalie Loyce Holloway, was a former United States district judge who served as the chief judge of the United States District Court for the District of Columbia, and was the first African-American woman in U.S. history to serve as chief judge of a United States district court.  Notably, Johnson presided over the grand jury investigation into President Bill Clinton’s affair with Monica Lewinsky.

Education and career

Johnson was born on July 28, 1932 in Lake Charles, Louisiana, to Henry and Beatrice Williams Holloway. Johnson received a Bachelor of Science degree from District of Columbia Teachers College (now the University of the District of Columbia) in 1955 and a Juris Doctor from Georgetown Law in 1962. She entered private practice in Washington, D.C., and then became a trial attorney at the United States Department of Justice Civil Division from 1963 to 1967. She worked as an assistant corporation counsel (a position later retitled Assistant Attorney General) for the District of Columbia from 1967 to 1970. In 1970, Johnson was appointed by President Richard Nixon to be a judge of the District of Columbia Superior Court.

Federal judicial service

Johnson was nominated by President Jimmy Carter on February 28, 1980, to a seat on the United States District Court for the District of Columbia vacated by Judge George Luzerne Hart Jr. She was confirmed by the United States Senate on May 9, 1980, and received her commission on May 12, 1980. She served as chief judge from 1997 until June 18, 2001, when she assumed senior status. Johnson served in that capacity until her retirement on December 31, 2003.

President Clinton grand jury investigation and notable rulings
As the chief judge of the United States District Court for the District of Columbia, the Washington Post referred to Johnson as a "Key Player" in the 1998 grand jury investigation of President Bill Clinton due to her having to rule on a raft of motions relating to the investigation by independent counsel Kenneth W. Starr.

As chief judge from 1997 to 2001, Johnson oversaw legal issues emanating from grand jury investigations; one of her most demanding assignments came when independent counsel Kenneth W. Starr began investigating President Bill Clinton’s relationship with White House intern Monica Lewinsky. Accordingly, Johnson ruled on Kenneth Starr's probe of the Clinton administration. Notably, in 1998, as Starr was attempting to use a grand jury to gather evidence against President Clinton, Johnson ruled that Clinton could not assert a privilege that would have blocked the independent counsel from questioning White House aides. Specifically, Johnson ruled that President Clinton's right to executive privilege was outweighed by Starr's legitimate need for evidence. That decision and others permitted Starr to move ahead with his obstruction of justice inquiry of the president.

Johnson also oversaw the conviction of Rita Lavelle on charges of making false statements, obstruction of a congressional investigation, and perjury and sentenced her to prison.

Additionally, in sentencing former congressman Dan Rostenkowski to 17 months in prison for mail fraud, she told the once-powerful chairman of the House Ways and Means Committee in 1996 that “you capriciously pursued a course of personal gain for you, your family and your friends. You have stained them, as well as yourself.”

Death

Johnson died September 18, 2011, at her brother's home in her native Lake Charles, following a stroke.

Family

Through Johnson's mother, Johnson was a first cousin of Rupert Richardson, an African-American civil rights activist and civil rights leader who served as the president of the National Association for the Advancement of Colored People (NAACP) from 1992 to 1995.

See also 
 List of African-American federal judges
 List of African-American jurists
 List of first women lawyers and judges in Washington D.C. (Federal District)

References

Sources
 

1932 births
2011 deaths
African-American judges
Georgetown University Law Center alumni
Judges of the United States District Court for the District of Columbia
People from Lake Charles, Louisiana
United States district court judges appointed by Jimmy Carter
20th-century American judges
University of the District of Columbia alumni
Judges of the Superior Court of the District of Columbia
United States Department of Justice lawyers
20th-century American women judges